Kemal Horulu (9 March 1926 – 6 November 1991) was a Turkish sprinter. He competed in the men's 400 metres at the 1948 Summer Olympics.

References

1926 births
1991 deaths
Athletes (track and field) at the 1948 Summer Olympics
Athletes (track and field) at the 1952 Summer Olympics
Turkish male sprinters
Turkish male hurdlers
Olympic athletes of Turkey
Place of birth missing
20th-century Turkish people